Chresten is the Danish equivalent of Christian. It may refer to:

Chresten (singer) (born 1988), full name Chresten Falck Damborg, Danish singer 
Christen Berg (1829–1891), Danish liberal politician and editor
Chresten Davis (born 1975), New Zealand rugby union player

See also
 Christen (disambiguation)